Bermuda Tentacles is an American made-for-television science fiction horror film directed by Nick Lyon. It stars Linda Hamilton and features an ensemble cast of Trevor Donovan, Mýa, John Savage and Jamie Kennedy. The movie premiered April 12, 2014 on the Syfy channel and garnered largely negative reviews.

Plot
When Air Force One goes down over the Bermuda Triangle, the Navy sends its best rescue team. A terrible storm forces the president to leave in his escape pod, which ends up 7000 metres below the sea. But before they can save the President, the team awakens a series of tentacles from a monstrous underwater ogrot, which threatens America's entire Eastern Seaboard and, ultimately, the world.

Cast
 Linda Hamilton as Admiral Hansen
 Trevor Donovan as Trip Oliver
 Mýa as Lieutenant Plummer
 John Savage as President DeSteno
 Jamie Kennedy as Dr. Zimmer
 Richard Whiten as Lieutenant Commander Barclay
 Ricco Ross as Captain Phillips
 Jeff Rector as Captain Warren
 Robert Blanche as Captain Dave Williams
 Angelique Cinelu as Ensign Sanchez
 Luke White as Stephen Hondo
 Stephanie Cantu as Riva
 Yorick Veenma as Colonel Poppe De Boer
 James Craig as Aunt Penelope
 William McMahon as Fitz
 Darren Anthony Thomas as Greg Elfman
 Craig Blair as C.P.O. Vincent

Home media
Bermuda Tentacles was released to DVD on September 9, 2014.

Reception
Writing for online website HorrorNews.Net, Shawn Handling gave the movie a highly negative review and concluded, "I think it’s one of the worst that has been produced and should have been sunk with the rest of those missing ships."

References

External links

2014 television films
2014 films
Syfy original films
2010s science fiction horror films
2014 horror films
American monster movies
Giant monster films
American horror television films
Films set in the Bermuda Triangle
The Asylum films
Films about Air Force One
Films directed by Nick Lyon
2010s American films